Vance C. Smith (born February 27, 1952) is an American politician and businessman from Georgia. Smith is a Republican member of Georgia House of Representatives representing the 133rd district since 2019.

Education 
In 1974, Smith earned a Bachelor of Science degree in Economics from Columbus State University.

Career 
Smith is the founder and CEO of Vance Smith Contracting and Consulting. Prior to that, Smith acted as President and CEO of Vance Smith Construction Company which was founded in 1974.

From 2009-2011, Smith served as the commissioner of the Georgia Department of Transportation. Prior to his election as representative for the 133rd district, Smith had represented Harris, Muscogee, and Troup counties in the Georgia House of Representatives.

On November 6, 2018, Smith won the election unopposed and became a Republican member of Georgia House of Representatives for District 133. On November 3, 2020, as an incumbent, Smith won the election unopposed and continued serving District 133.

Smith was appointed to the House Majority Deputy Whip Team for the 2019-2020 legislative term in 2019. Smith is the Vice Chairman of the Natural Resources & Environment committee and serves on the Economic Development & Tourism, Transportation, and Ways & Means committees as a member.

Personal life 
Smith's wife is Michele Smith. They have three children. Smith and his family live in Pine Mountain, Georgia.

References

External links 
 Vance Smith Jr. at ourcampaigns.com

21st-century American politicians
Businesspeople from Georgia (U.S. state)
Living people
Republican Party members of the Georgia House of Representatives
1952 births